Roaring Branch is an unincorporated community in Tioga and Lycoming counties, Pennsylvania, United States.

References

Unincorporated communities in Lycoming County, Pennsylvania
Unincorporated communities in Tioga County, Pennsylvania
Unincorporated communities in Pennsylvania